Le braconnier de Dieu is a 1983 French comedy drama film directed by Jean-Pierre Darras.

Cast

 Pierre Mondy as Brother Grégoire
 Jean Lefebvre as Vincent Espérandieu
 Annie Cordy as Jofrette
 Michel Galabru as Hilaire
 Jean-Pierre Darras as Frisou
 Catherine Allégret as Marie-Fraise
 Roger Pierre as M. Martin
 Bernard Haller as Jesus
 Sylvain Rougerie as Ulysse
 Corinne Lahaye as Muscade
 Jacques Préboist as Joseph
 Arielle Sémenoff as Magali
 Daniel Ceccaldi as The Abbot
 Paul Préboist as The Priest
 Rosy Varte as The Musician 1
 Odette Laure as The Musician 2
 Marthe Mercadier as The Hospitality
 Henri Génès as The Café's owner
 Jacques Dynam as The Brigadier
 Michel Modo as The president of the polling station
 Robert Rollis as The Lieutenant CRS

References

External links
 

French comedy-drama films
1983 comedy-drama films
1983 films
Films scored by Claude Bolling
1980s French films